Truong Tran (born 1969 in Ho Chi Minh City) is a Vietnamese-American poet, visual artist, and teacher. He is an author of five collections of poetry and a children's book.  As a visual artist Tran is best known for mixed media pieces though he has worked in multiple mediums. His work is in private collections, and he has been honored with solo shows and an exhibition catalog "I Meant to Say Please Pass the Sugar: Mixed Media Works 2009- Present" (2014).

Early life and career
Tran was born in Saigon prior to his family emigrating to the United States and settling in the San Francisco Bay Area. Tran currently lives in San Francisco, where he teaches creative writing at San Francisco State University and Mills College in Oakland. He has also taught at  UC Berkeley Extension CSU Long Beach and Goddard College.

Tran received a Bachelor of Arts degree from the University of California, Santa Cruz in 1992. He received a Master of Fine Arts degree from San Francisco State University in 1995.

Poetry and prose 
Truong Tran's poetry has been translated into Spanish, Dutch and French. Tran was the featured poet at the Poetry International Festival in Rotterdam in 2011. Tran's collection dust and conscience (2002) won the San Francisco Poetry Center Book Prize.The Book of Perceptions (1999), was a finalist for a Kiriyama Prize and placing the accents (1999), was a finalist for a Western States Book Award for Poetry. The correspondence between Truong Tran and poet Wanda Colman is included in the collection, Letters to Poets: Conversations About Poetics, Politics, and Community (2008).

Visual art
In February 2010, Tran debuted his first solo exhibition as a visual artist, "the lost and the found", at the Kearney Street Workshop in San Francisco. In February 2013 he had a joint show with Peter Max Lawrence "AT WAR" at SOMArts, in San Francisco. In 2014, his show at the Telegraph Hill Gallery garnered international attention, in part because it featured "9,000 paper butterflies individually cut from old pornographic magazines" as a protest of what Tran considered the "obscenity" of the destruction of 9000 living butterflies by Damien Hirst as a by-product of a piece of Hirst's art. In March, 2015 Tran's work was exhibited in a joint show with artist Jaime Cortez to innaguerate the new gallery space in California Institute of Intgeral Studies.

Honors and awards

San Francisco Arts Commission Grants
Ina Coolbrith Prize in Poetry, 1992
Browning Society Prize in Poetry, 1994
Kiriyama Book Prize Finalist, 1998
Western States Book Prize Finalist in Poetry, 1999
San Francisco Library Laureate, 2000
San Francisco Poetry Center Prize for dust and consciousness, 2002
Intersection for the Arts Writer In Residence, 2003 
San Francisco Arts Commission Cultural Equity Grant, 2003 
The Fund For Poetry Grant, 2007

Bibliography 
Poetry
The Book of Perceptions (1999)
Placing the Accents (1999)
dust and conscience (2002)
within the margins (2004)
Four Letter Words (2008)
100 Words (2021)
The Book of the Other: Small in Comparison (2021)

Children's Books
Going Home Coming Home (2003)

Art
 I Meant to Say Please Pass the Sugar (2014)

References

External links 
 Apogee Press

Vietnamese emigrants to the United States
American male poets
American artists
American writers of Vietnamese descent
1969 births
Living people
21st-century American poets
21st-century American male writers